Giacomo Conti (June 24, 1918 – July 8, 1992) was an Italian bobsledder who competed in the late 1950s. He won the gold medal in the two-man event at the 1956 Winter Olympics in Cortina d'Ampezzo.

References
 Bobsleigh two-man Olympic medalists 1932-56 and since 1964
 DatabaseOlympics.com profile

1918 births
1992 deaths
Bobsledders at the 1956 Winter Olympics
Italian male bobsledders
Olympic bobsledders of Italy
Olympic gold medalists for Italy
Olympic medalists in bobsleigh
Medalists at the 1956 Winter Olympics
Sportspeople from Palermo